The following is a list of St Helens R.F.C.'s honours and records, both personal of individuals and of the team as a whole, that have been set over the 137-year history of the club.

Team honours

Titles

Biggest win

Heaviest defeat

Largest Attendance

Record attendance in Super League era

Player honours

Century of tries
Below is a list of players who have scored 100 or more tries for St Helens:

All-Time Records
Below are the all-time scoring and in-game records achieved by St Helens

Tries in a game

Goals in a game

Most points in a game

Most tries in a season

Most goals in a season

Most points in a season

Most career tries

Most career goals

Most career points

Most career appearances

List of coaches

St Helens R.F.C.